Mississippi is a state of the United States of America.

Mississippi may also refer to:

Places 
 Mississippi River, a river in central United States
 Mississippi River System, a system of rivers in the Mississippi River watershed
 Mississippi River (Ontario), a river in Canada
 Mississippi Lake, a lake in Ontario, Canada
 Mississippi Territory, a former territory of the United States
 Republic of Mississippi, a former republic of the Confederate States of America
 Mississippi-in-Africa, a former settler colony of ex-slaves in West Africa
 Mississippi County, Arkansas
 Mississippi County, Missouri

History 
 Mississippian culture, a Native American civilization from 800 CE to 1600 CE

Film and television 
 Mississippi (film), a 1935 musical starring W. C. Fields and Bing Crosby
 The Mississippi (TV series), a 1983–84 TV series starring Ralph Waite

Music 
 Mississippi: The Album, a 2003 album by David Banner
 Mississippi (band) an Australian rock band active 1970–75

Songs
 "M-I-S-S-I-S-S-I-P-P-I", a 1916 song written by Bert Hanlon and Ben Ryan, performed and recorded by Red Foley in 1949
 "Mississippi", a 1970 recording by John Phillips
 "Mississippi" (Pussycat song), 1975
 "Mississippi" (Charlie Daniels song), 1979
 "Mississippi", a 1996 song by Paula Cole from the album This Fire
 "Mississippi", a 2001 song by Train from the album Drops of Jupiter
 "Mississippi" (Bob Dylan song), 2001
 "Mississippi", a 2017 song by Jamie Lenman from the album Devolver

Schools 
 Mississippi College
 Mississippi State University
 University of Mississippi

Ships
 Mississippi-class battleship
 USS Mississippi, a list of United States Navy ships
 CSS Mississippi, a projected ironclad of the Confederate States Navy
 MV Mississippi, a diesel towboat

See also 
 Mississippi Township (disambiguation)
 Mississippian (disambiguation)